A flatfish is a member of the ray-finned demersal fish order Pleuronectiformes, also called the Heterosomata, sometimes classified as a suborder of Perciformes.  In many species, both eyes lie on one side of the head, one or the other migrating through or around the head during development. Some species face their left sides upward, some face their right sides upward, and others face either side upward.

Many important food fish are in this order, including the flounders, soles, turbot, plaice, and halibut. Some flatfish can camouflage themselves on the ocean floor.

Taxonomy
Over 800 described species are placed into 16 families. Broadly, the flatfishes are divided into two suborders, Psettodoidei and Pleuronectoidei, with > 99% of the species diversity found within the Pleuronectoidei. The largest families are Soleidae, Bothidae and Cynoglossidae with more than 150 species each. There also exist two monotypic families (Paralichthodidae and Oncopteridae). Some families are the results of relatively recent splits. For example, the Achiridae were classified as a subfamily of Soleidae in the past, and the Samaridae were considered a subfamily of the Pleuronectidae. The families Paralichthodidae, Poecilopsettidae, and Rhombosoleidae were also traditionally treated as subfamilies of Pleuronectidae, but are now recognised as families in their own right. The Paralichthyidae has long been indicated to be paraphyletic, with the formal description of Cyclopsettidae in 2019 resulting in the split of this family as well.

The taxonomy of some groups is in need of a review, as the last monograph covering the entire order was John Roxborough Norman's Monograph of the Flatfishes published in 1934. In particular, Tephrinectes sinensis may represent a family-level lineage and requires further evaluation e.g.  New species are described with some regularity and undescribed species likely remain.

Hybrids
Hybrids are well known in flatfishes. The Pleuronectidae, of marine fishes, have the largest number of reported hybrids. Two of the most famous intergeneric hybrids are between the European plaice (Pleuronectes platessa) and European flounder (Platichthys flesus) in the Baltic Sea, and between the English sole (Parophrys vetulus) and starry flounder (Platichthys stellatus) in Puget Sound. The offspring of the latter species pair is popularly known as the hybrid sole and was initially believed to be a valid species in its own right.

Distribution
Flatfishes are found in oceans worldwide, ranging from the Arctic, through the tropics, to Antarctica. Species diversity is centered in the Indo-West Pacific and declines following both latitudinal and longitudinal gradients away from the Indo-West Pacific. None have been confirmed from the abyssal or hadal zones. An observation of a flatfish from the Bathyscaphe Trieste at the bottom of the Mariana Trench at a depth of almost  has been questioned by fish experts, and recent authorities do not recognize it as valid. Among the deepwater species, Symphurus thermophilus lives congregating around "ponds" of sulphur at hydrothermal vents on the seafloor. No other flatfish is known from hydrothermal vents. Many species will enter brackish or fresh water, and a smaller number of soles (families Achiridae and Soleidae) and tonguefish (Cynoglossidae) are entirely restricted to fresh water.

Characteristics

The most obvious characteristic of the flatfish is its asymmetry, with both eyes lying on the same side of the head in the adult fish. In some families, the eyes are usually on the right side of the body (dextral or right-eyed flatfish), and in others, they are usually on the left (sinistral or left-eyed flatfish). The primitive spiny turbots include equal numbers of right- and left-sided individuals, and are generally less asymmetrical than the other families. Other distinguishing features of the order are the presence of protrusible eyes, another adaptation to living on the seabed (benthos), and the extension of the dorsal fin onto the head.

The surface of the fish facing away from the sea floor is pigmented, often serving to camouflage the fish, but sometimes with striking coloured patterns. Some flatfishes are also able to change their pigmentation to match the background, in a manner similar to some cephalopods. The side of the body without the eyes, facing the seabed, is usually colourless or very pale.

In general, flatfishes rely on their camouflage for avoiding predators, but some have aposematic traits such as conspicuous eyespots (e.g., Microchirus ocellatus) and several small tropical species (at least Aseraggodes, Pardachirus and Zebrias) are poisonous. Juveniles of Soleichthys maculosus mimic toxic flatworms of the genus Pseudobiceros in both colours and swimming mode.  Conversely, a few octopus species have been reported to mimic flatfishes in colours, shape and swimming mode.

The flounders and spiny turbots eat smaller fish, and have well-developed teeth. They sometimes seek prey in the midwater, away from the bottom, and show fewer extreme adaptations than other families. The soles, by contrast, are almost exclusively bottom-dwellers, and feed on invertebrates. They show a more extreme asymmetry, and may lack teeth on one side of the jaw.

Species and species groups

 Brill
 Dab
 Sanddab
 Flounder
 Halibut
 Megrim
 Plaice
 Sole
 Tonguefish
 Turbot

Reproduction
Flatfishes lay eggs that hatch into larvae resembling typical, symmetrical, fish. These are initially elongated, but quickly develop into a more rounded form. The larvae typically have protective spines on the head, over the gills, and in the pelvic and pectoral fins. They also possess a swim bladder, and do not dwell on the bottom, instead dispersing from their hatching grounds as plankton.

The length of the planktonic stage varies between different types of flatfishes, but eventually they begin to metamorphose into the adult form. One of the eyes migrates across the top of the head and onto the other side of the body, leaving the fish blind on one side. The larva also loses its swim bladder and spines, and sinks to the bottom, laying its blind side on the underlying surface.

Evolution

In 2008, a 50-million-year-old fossil, Amphistium, was identified as an early relative of the flatfish and transitional fossil. In a typical modern flatfish, the head is asymmetric, with both eyes on one side of the head. In Amphistium, the transition from the typical symmetric head of a vertebrate is incomplete, with one eye placed near the top of the head. The researchers concluded,  "the change happened gradually, in a way consistent with evolution via natural selection—not suddenly, as researchers once had little choice but to believe."

Flatfishes have been cited as dramatic examples of evolutionary adaptation. Richard Dawkins, in The Blind Watchmaker, explains the flatfishes' evolutionary history thus:

…bony fish as a rule have a marked tendency to be flattened in a vertical direction…. It was natural, therefore, that when the ancestors of [flatfish] took to the sea bottom, they should have lain on one side….  But this raised the problem that one eye was always looking down into the sand and was effectively useless. In evolution this problem was solved by the lower eye ‘moving’ round to the upper side.

As food
Flatfish is considered a Whitefish because of the high concentration of oils within its liver. Its lean flesh makes for a unique flavor that differs from species to species. Methods of cooking include grilling, pan-frying, baking and deep-frying.

Timeline of genera

See also

 Sinistral and dextral

References

Further references
 
 Gibson, Robin N (Ed) (2008) Flatfishes: biology and exploitation. Wiley.
 Munroe, Thomas A  (2005) "Distributions and biogeography." Flatfishes: Biology and Exploitation: 42-67.

External links
Information on Canadian fisheries of plaice

Commercial fish
 
Articles which contain graphical timelines
Extant Paleocene first appearances
Asymmetry